Jessica Ann Simpson Johnson (born July 10, 1980) is an American singer, actress, entrepreneur and philanthropist. After performing in church choirs as a child, Simpson signed with Columbia Records in 1997, aged seventeen. Her debut studio album, Sweet Kisses (1999), sold two million copies in the United States and saw the commercial success of the single "I Wanna Love You Forever". Simpson adopted a more mature image for her second studio album, Irresistible (2001), and its title track became her second top 20 entry on the Billboard Hot 100, while the album was certified gold by the Recording Industry Association of America (RIAA). In This Skin (2003), Simpson's third studio album, sold three million copies in the United States. 

During her earlier career, Simpson became known for her relationship with and later marriage to Nick Lachey, with whom she also appeared on the MTV reality television series Newlyweds: Nick and Jessica between 2003 and 2005. Following the release of her first Christmas album ReJoyce: The Christmas Album (2004), which was certified gold, Simpson made her film debut as Daisy Duke in The Dukes of Hazzard (2005). She also recorded a cover of "These Boots Are Made for Walkin'" for the film's soundtrack. In 2006, she released her fifth studio album A Public Affair and appeared in the romantic comedy film Employee of the Month. With the release of her sixth studio album Do You Know (2008), Simpson moved into the country music genre.

Aside from her musical pursuits, Simpson launched The Jessica Simpson Collection in 2005, a fashion focused line with 34 product categories. To date, the brand has earned over $1 billion in revenue and is the most successful celebrity licensing brand in history. She also starred on the reality television series The Price of Beauty in 2010, judged clothing designs on two seasons of Fashion Star between 2012 and 2013.  Simpson is married to Eric Johnson, with whom she has three children.

Life and career

1980–1998: Childhood and career beginnings
Simpson was born on July 10, 1980, in Abilene, Texas. She is the first child of Tina Ann Simpson (née Drew), a homemaker, and Joseph Simpson, a psychologist and Baptist youth minister. Simpson's parents married in 1978; they divorced in 2013. Simpson has stated that she grew up in Dallas and Waco, but her parents now live in McGregor, Texas. Simpson has a younger sister, Ashlee. In her preteens she briefly attended Amelia Middle School while her father did outreach in Cincinnati, Ohio. After moving back to Texas 20 months later, she attended J. J. Pearce High School in Richardson during her teenage years, though she had to drop out in 1997 as her career began to take off; a year later she later earned her GED via distance learning through Texas Tech High School. Simpson was raised in the Christian faith, and was given a purity ring by her father when she was twelve years old. Jessica and her family moved frequently due to her father's job as a minister, though they remained in Texas for the most part; however, they did live in the Midwest for a few years.

She began singing in the church choir as a child. When she was eleven, she dreamed of success as a singer while at a church retreat. Simpson auditioned for The Mickey Mouse Club at the age of twelve, auditioning with a performance of "Amazing Grace" and dancing to "Ice Ice Baby" (1990). She advanced through multiple rounds, eventually being a semi-finalist for the show alongside artists such as Britney Spears, Christina Aguilera, and Justin Timberlake. Simpson claimed that she became nervous about her final audition after seeing Aguilera perform, and she was not selected for the show, ultimately. Simpson resumed performing in her church choir, being discovered by the head of a Christian music label eventually. He asked her for an audition initially and signed her immediately after she performed "I Will Always Love You" (1973) by Dolly Parton. She began working on her debut album with Proclaim Records and touring to promote the project. Jessica's father later claimed that she had to quit touring as the size of her breasts led to her being deemed too "sexual" for the genre.

Her debut album, Jessica, remained unreleased after Proclaim Records went bankrupt; despite this, her grandmother funded a limited pressing of the album personally. Shortly after this, Simpson landed several auditions as Jessica was sent to numerous labels and producers. Ultimately, she caught the attention of Tommy Mottola, then married to Mariah Carey and the head of Columbia Records. He went on to sign her to the label at the behest of Columbia talent scout Teresa LaBarbera Whites, claiming "She had a great little look and a great attitude, a fresh new face, and something a bit different than Britney and all of them; she could actually sing." Simpson began working on her debut album in Orlando, Florida. Mottola hoped to market Simpson as a contrast to Spears and Aguilera, both of whom had launched successful careers focused on dancing and sexuality. While working on her musical debut, Simpson enlisted her father Joe as her manager; her mother became her stylist. While at a Christmas party in 1998, Simpson met 98 Degrees singer Nick Lachey, and the two began dating; Lachey claimed that he left the party and told his mother that he would marry Simpson someday.

1999–2001: Breakthrough with early musical releases

Simpson began working on her debut studio album in 1998. Mottola wanted Simpson to embrace an "anti-sex appeal" image while promoting the record, in contrast to those of highly successful artists Britney Spears and Christina Aguilera. He believed the image would make Simpson more "relatable" to listeners, therefore aiding in sales. Simpson went on to announce her plans to remain abstinent until marriage as a result of Mottola's decision. Her debut single, "I Wanna Love You Forever" (1999), was released on September 28. The single became a success in numerous territories, most notably reaching number three on the Billboard Hot 100 chart in the United States. The song earned a platinum certification from the Recording Industry Association of America (RIAA) for sales exceeding one million copies in the country. The album had some success in other territories as well, most notably in several European countries.

Simpson's debut studio album, Sweet Kisses (1999), was released on November 23. The album sold 65,000 copies in its first week of release, debuting at number sixty-five on the Billboard 200 chart in the United States. To promote the record, "Where You Are" (2000) was released as the second single from the album; Simpson's boyfriend Nick Lachey was featured on the track. "I Think I'm in Love with You" (2000) served as the album's third and final single and achieved success in territories such as the United States. With the success of the album's third single, Sweet Kisses rose to a new peak of number twenty-five on the Billboard 200 in August 2000. The album sold over two million copies in the United States, earning a double platinum certification from the RIAA. Simpson embarked on the Heat It Up Tour with her boyfriend's band, 98 Degrees, as their opening act to promote Sweet Kisses throughout 2000.

Work on her second album began in 2000, opting to record more "radio-friendly" and upbeat songs for the record. During the recording of the album, Simpson adopted a more mature public image, a decision Simpson and her record label made in hopes to achieve the success of artists such as Spears. While working on the record, Simpson ended her relationship with Lachey to focus on furthering her career; however, the two reconciled romantically that September. In a July 2001 interview with Coventry Newspapers, Simpson explained "I recorded [Sweet Kisses] when I was seventeen years old and I'm twenty-one [this month] so there is four years of growth involved." Simpson released the record's title track, "Irresistible" (2001) as the lead single from the project in April. The single received a generally mixed reaction from critics due to its sexual themes, though it became her second top twenty hit on the Billboard Hot 100 chart.

Simpson released her second studio album, Irresistible (2001), in May. The album sold 127,000 copies in the United States during its first week of release, debuting at number six on the Billboard 200 chart. Though the album's first week sales nearly doubled those of her previous effort, Irresistible failed to match the success of her debut album; the record earned a gold certification from the RIAA for sales of 500,000 copies. "A Little Bit" (2001), the album's second and final single, failed to achieve much success. To promote the record, Simpson embarked as a co-headliner on the Total Request Live Tour (2001) alongside artists such as Destiny's Child and Nelly. She later left the tour to launch her own DreamChaser Tour (2001), for which Simpson added choreography and backup dancers to her performances; the tour was canceled following the September 11 attacks.

2002–2005: Marriage to Nick Lachey and heightened success
Simpson announced her engagement to Nick Lachey in February 2002, with the two holding their wedding ceremony on October 26 in Austin, Texas. Simpson also began working on her third studio album in 2002. The album's lead single, "Sweetest Sin" (2003), dealt with the topic of Simpson losing her virginity to Lachey lyrically. The song failed to achieve commercial success. Simpson's father pitched an idea to MTV about a reality show starring the couple, resulting in the creation of Newlyweds: Nick and Jessica. The series focused on the marriage between Michael Jackson and Lisa Marie Presley initially, but the two backed out, allowing Simpson and Lachey to replace them. The show, which focused on the couple's marriage and the recording of Simpson's third studio album primarily, premiered on August 19, 2003. The show became a pop culture phenomenon instantly, with Simpson's perceived "dumb blonde" antics on the show helping to make the couple a household name. The series was a ratings success for MTV and aired for three seasons until 2005.

Simpson's third studio album, In This Skin (2003), was released the day that Newlyweds: Nick and Jessica premiered, with the show serving as a promotional tool for the record. In This Skin debuted at number ten on the Billboard 200, selling 64,000 copies in its first week of release. The album's opening numbers served as the lowest of Simpson's career at the time. In This Skin quickly declined the chart, and by December 2003 had sold just over 565,000 copies in the United States. Simpson released "With You" (2003) as the second single from the album in October. The single became a hit, reaching the top twenty of the Billboard Hot 100 and topping the Mainstream Top 40 chart based on radio airplay. Simpson appeared in the halftime show of the Super Bowl XXXVIII. She recorded new material for a re-release of In This Skin, which was released in March 2004. The re-release aided in album sales dramatically; In This Skin went on to sell three million copies in the United States. Both "Take My Breath Away" (2004) and "Angels" (2004) were released as singles from the re-release.

Simpson and Lachey starred in the ABC special The Nick and Jessica Variety Hour in April, which featured guest appearances by celebrities such as Jewel and Mr. T, among others. That same month, she launched her Jessica Simpson Desserts by Jessica Simpson cosmetics line along with Randi Shinder; all of the products in the line were edible. Simpson embarked on her Reality Tour (2004) throughout North America beginning in June; the tour was a financial success, and ended in October. During this time, Simpson and her husband began making guest appearances on The Ashlee Simpson Show, chronicling the start of Jessica's sister's music career. Simpson's fourth studio album, a collection of Christmas themed songs titled ReJoyce: The Christmas Album (2004), was released on November 23. The album reached a peak of number fourteen on the Billboard 200, and was certified gold by the RIAA for sales exceeding 500,000 copies. Also in 2004, Simpson filmed a sitcom pilot for ABC, which the network did not pick-up. In February 2005, Simpson and Shinder launched the Dessert Treats edible cosmetics line, similar to their prior line but targeted towards a younger audience. Both lines were canceled following a string of lawsuits.

Simpson performed "The Star-Spangled Banner" at the Indy 500 in 2005. Simpson launched The Jessica Simpson Collection in 2005, initially partnering with Tarrant Apparel Group to release the Princy and JS by Jessica Simpson clothing lines. The company has continued to grow throughout the years, and in 2014 was reported to earn $1 billion in annual sales. Simpson made her film debut as Daisy Duke in the film adaption of The Dukes of Hazzard (2005). While the film was met with negative reviews from film critics generally, it grossed over $111 million worldwide. Simpson recorded the song "These Boots Are Made For Walkin'" (2005) to promote the film; it both samples and shares the title of a Nancy Sinatra song. The song entered the top twenty of the Billboard Hot 100, becoming one Simpson's most successful singles to date. The music video, which featured Simpson in character as Daisy Duke, was controversial for featuring Simpson in "revealing" outfits and washing the General Lee car in her bikini. The controversy resulted in the music video being banned in some countries. In November 2005, Simpson and Lachey announced they were separating. Simpson filed for divorce in December 2005, citing "irreconcilable differences." Their divorce was publicized worldwide and finalized on June 30, 2006. Reportedly, she had to pay Lachey $12 million in their divorce since she had not signed a pre-nuptial agreement before they wed. In a 2015 interview, Simpson called her marriage to Lachey her "biggest financial mistake".

2006–2009: A Public Affair, other movies, and Do You Know
Simpson began working on her fifth studio album in 2005. March 2006 saw her parted ways with Columbia Records, with whom she had worked since the launch of her career, and had signed a new recording contract with Epic Records. Simpson and stylist Ken Pavés launched a line of hair and beauty products on the Home Shopping Network in 2006. Simpson released her new single, "A Public Affair" (2006) on June 29. The song entered the top twenty of the Billboard Hot 100, and earned a gold certification from the RIAA for sales exceeding 500,000 copies in the United States. The single, an upbeat breakup song, was released the day before her divorce from Lachey was finalized.  Most notably, the song entered the top ten of the iTunes Store at the same time as her sister's single "Invisible" (2006), marking the first time that two siblings had appeared in the store's top ten simultaneously.

Her fifth studio album, A Public Affair (2006), debuted at number five on the Billboard 200 with first-week sales of 101,000 copies. The album failed to match the success of In This Skin (2003), selling just over 500,000 copies in the United States. The empowerment anthem "I Belong to Me" (2006), which served as the album's second and final single, failed to achieve commercial success. Simpson starred alongside Dane Cook and Dax Shepard in the comedy film Employee of the Month (2006), released that October. The film received a negative critical reaction and failed to achieve commercial success. Simpson performed a cover of the Dolly Parton song "9 to 5" (1980) as a tribute to the artist at the Kennedy Center Awards in December 2006. Simpson forgot the lyrics to the song and the performance received harsh criticism; she also received a chance to redo the song for the cameras, though her performance was cut from the broadcast ultimately. Critics noted the underperformance of both Simpson's fifth studio album and her second film as her sister Ashlee experienced a similar decline in success.

Simpson had an on-again, off-again relationship with singer-songwriter John Mayer from August 2006 to May 2007. Long after their breakup, Simpson described her relationship with Mayer in her 2020 memoir, Open Book.

In November 2007, Simpson began dating Dallas Cowboys quarterback Tony Romo. Cowboys fans considered the relationship controversial, as some blamed Simpson for Romo's poor performance in games after the pair got together. Some fans dubbed Simpson "Yoko Romo," a reference to Yoko Ono, to whom many fans of The Beatles attributed the quartet disbanding in 1970.  Even then-president George W. Bush commented on the pair's relationship, blaming Simpson implicitly for Romo's lackluster performances. Reportedly, Simpson and Romo ended their relationship in July 2009. During the relationship, Simpson also appeared alongside Luke Wilson in the film Blonde Ambition (2007); it had a limited release in Texas before being released on home media. Later, she starred in the direct-to-video film Private Valentine: Blonde & Dangerous (2008), portraying an actress who joins the military. The film received a negative reaction overwhelmingly upon its release. Simpson collaborated with Parlux Fragrances to launch her first scent, Fancy, in 2008. The fragrance, unlike Private Valentine, received a positive commercial reaction.

Simpson began working on her sixth studio album in 2007, with her father claiming that she was experimenting with country music for the record. Simpson claimed to have grown up around country music, and wanted to "give something back." She released "Come On Over" (2008) as the project's lead single on June 20. The song debuted at number forty-one on the Billboard Hot Country Songs chart, making it the highest debut for an artist's first entry on that chart. Do You Know (2008) was released on September 9. The project sold 65,000 copies in its first week of release, debuting at number four on the Billboard 200 chart. The album has sold just over 200,000 copies in the United States as of 2012. Simpson opened for country music group Rascal Flatts on their Bob That Head Tour (2009) from January to March 2009. Simpson's attempt to transition into country music received a negative reaction. Most notably, a crowd booed her following a performance at the Country Thunder Festival in Wisconsin. Simpson’s work also garnered references in Eminem's 2009 song "We Made You" and Trisha Paytas portrayed her.

2010–present: Motherhood, second marriage, and focus on business ventures

Simpson's VH1 documentary series, The Price of Beauty, began airing in March 2010. The series followed Simpson around the world, introducing viewers to the different perceptions of beauty in different cultures. The premiere episode attracted one million viewers, but Simpson revealed that the series would return in 2011 with a format change; these plans never came to fruition. Simpson planned to record her seventh studio album as her final release through Epic Records initially, though released the compilation album Playlist: The Very Best of Jessica Simpson (2010) ultimately. Epic Records released the album with no promotion and to little success. Simpson later signed a new recording contract with eleveneleven and Primary Wave Music and began working on her Christmas-themed seventh studio album. She released Happy Christmas (2010) on November 22 and it appeared on the lower half of the Billboard 200 chart only briefly. Simpson began dating retired NFL tight end Eric Johnson in May 2010 and the couple announced their engagement in November of that year.

Soon, Simpson appeared alongside Nicole Richie as a mentor on the NBC reality television series Fashion Star. The series revolved around a group of designers who competed each week to create clothing; each week, the judges eliminated one contestant. The series aired the second season in 2013, though NBC canceled it afterward. Following months of speculation, Simpson confirmed on Halloween of 2011 that she was pregnant with her first child. Simpson signed a multimillion-dollar deal with Weight Watchers in 2012, vowing to use their diet plan to shed the weight she gained during her pregnancy. Simpson filmed television commercials for the company, with the first airing in September 2012. Simpson gave birth to a daughter, Maxwell Drew Johnson, on May 1, 2012. and also launched a maternity clothing line that year. She later released a perfume, Vintage Bloom, which motherhood inspired. Simpson confirmed in December 2012 that she was expecting a second child with Johnson. Following the announcement, Weight Watchers announced that she would discontinue following the company's diet plan during her pregnancy. Simpson gave birth to her son, Ace Knute Johnson, on June 30, 2013. She launched a bedroom decor line including bedding and draperies offered in a romantic bohemian style, with floral patterns. In August 2014, she added a signature fragrance. Simpson and Johnson married in July 2014 in Montecito, California.

In 2013, it was announced that Simpson was in talks with NBC to star in a semi-autobiographical comedy series, but the project never materialized.

Simpson confirmed in 2015 that she would begin working on her album, as her contract with Primary Wave had ended officially. Simpson is working with Linda Perry on the project, which she revealed in 2016. In August 2015, Simpson was a host on the HSN channel while promoting her products. The sales were a success. Simpson launched her Warm Up brand of workout clothing, available at retailers in the United States. She expanded the brand in August 2016 to include trainers, with Simpson commenting that she would focus more on the line in the future.

In September 2018, Simpson announced she was pregnant with her third child, a daughter. She gave birth to their daughter, Birdie Mae Johnson, on March 19, 2019.

On February 2, 2020, Simpson released her memoir Open Book, which topped The New York Times Best Seller list selling over 59,000 copies across all platforms in its first week. In the book, she discussed topics such as her marriage to Nick Lachey, her relationship with musician John Mayer, sexual abuse she experienced during her childhood, dependence on alcohol and prescription drugs, and the pressure she felt to lose weight, which caused her body image issues.
Six new songs were released as part of the book, marking her first release in music since Happy Christmas in 2010.

Musical style
Simpson has listed Whitney Houston, Mariah Carey, Aretha Franklin and Sade as influences on her music. She attempted to launch her career as a Christian music singer, and at one point completed a self-titled album of Christian music. When she signed with Columbia Records in 1998, she began working on an album of pop music. Simpson has recorded songs with Christian themes in later years, including "Pray Out Loud" (2008). The music on her debut album consisted of pop ballads primarily, with the intention of showcasing Simpson's vocals. AllMusic's Stephen Thomas Erlewine opined that the album "position[ed] her as the teen Celine Dion". Most notably, it featured the power ballad "I Wanna Love You Forever" (1999). The work drew comparisons to Mariah Carey. With the release of Irresistible (2001), Simpson recorded more upbeat songs, likening herself to artists such as Britney Spears. Songs such as "Irresistible" and "A Little Bit" had more provocative lyrics in comparison to her previous release, with Simpson citing the age difference between the recording of the two albums as the main reason. During the Total Request Live Tour (2001) and her DreamChaser Tour (2001), Simpson incorporated more choreography and backup dancers into her live performances.

Simpson began working on her third studio album in 2002 initially, on which rapper Missy Elliott would serve as the primary producer. The record later took on a new direction, which her then-husband Nick Lachey described as "organic" in comparison to her two prior albums. Simpson also began co-writing songs for the record, something she had been nervous to do in the past. The result was In This Skin (2003), a record that AllMusic said "stay[ed] within the contemporary dance-pop realm while inching toward the middle-of-the-road diva that she's always yearned to be." Simpson worked with elements of country music with the release of "These Boots Are Made For Walkin'" (2005), recorded for Simpson's feature film debut The Dukes of Hazzard (2005). She continued to experiment with the genre on the song "Push Your Tush" (2006). Numerous songs on her fifth studio album feature elements of dance and disco music, most notably "A Public Affair" and her cover of "You Spin Me Round (Like a Record)". Inspired by artists such as Faith Hill, Shania Twain, and Martina McBride, Simpson recorded a country music album titled Do You Know (2008). Throughout her career, Simpson has delved into other genres as well, releasing Christmas-themed albums in 2004 and 2010, respectively.

Public image

Simpson came to prominence as a teen idol in the late 1990s and the media described her as Columbia Records's "blond response to Britney Spears and Christina Aguilera", who had achieved recent success with their respective debut albums. Her debut album, Sweet Kisses (1999) mostly explores themes such as love, and Simpson announced that she would remain abstinent until marriage. She went through a "carefully orchestrated sexy makeover" while she promoted her second album, Irresistible (2001). Simpson later described Columbia's record executive Tommy Mottola as abusive, as he attempted to control her image and told her to "lose fifteen pounds" after she signed her contract in 1997.

Upon Simpson's rise to stardom with the success of Newlyweds: Nick and Jessica in 2003, media critics and the public perceived her as a "ditzy blonde" based on her antics and comments on the show. The Washington Posts Emily Yahr called her "one of our first reality TV stars, before anyone could absorb the psychological damage it could cause." Simpson recalled her time in the show in her 2020 memoir Open Book, saying: "Nowadays, I see so many people performing their identities on social media, but I feel like I was a guinea pig for that. How was I supposed to live a real, healthy life filtered through the lens of a reality show? If my personal life was my work, and my work required me to play a certain role, who even was I anymore?"

The media also described her as a sex symbol. Simpson's portrayal of Daisy Duke furthered her sex-symbol image, and she portrayed the character in her "These Boots Are Made For Walkin" music video, which presents "footage of Simpson writhing suggestively against a suds-soaked motor vehicle". The scene was parodied in Pink's "Stupid Girls" music video. Simpson also appeared as Daisy Duke in several television commercials for Pizza Hut airing during the Super Bowl in 2006 and 2007. Simpson claimed that the "[Daisy Duke] role created a "gold standard" that she would be judged by in the years that followed", and the media scrutinized her intensely following her weight gain in 2009.

Simpson is a registered Republican as of 2011. She endorsed George W. Bush during his presidential campaign in 2004, though she canceled an appearance at a 2006 Republican fundraiser as she felt it was not "appropriate". Though a Republican, Simpson praised former First Lady Michelle Obama during her husband's time in office, stating, "She's such an incredible woman, and she's with such a powerful man...Everything she does she exudes confidence."

Philanthropy
In April 2004, Simpson performed in VH1's benefit concert Divas Live 2004 alongside Ashanti, Cyndi Lauper, Gladys Knight, Joss Stone and Patti LaBelle to support the Save the Music Foundation. In May 2004, Simpson did a benefit concert to aid the Skin Care Foundation. In March 2007, Simpson donated a new Chrysler minivan to the Elim orphanage in Nuevo Laredo. Simpson is Soles4Souls's Ambassador and participated in autographing shoes to donate the money from communities across the United States. Simpson also works with Make-A-Wish Foundation.

Filmography

Films

Television

Discography

 Sweet Kisses (1999)
 Irresistible (2001)
 In This Skin (2003)
 ReJoyce: The Christmas Album (2004)
 A Public Affair (2006)
 Do You Know (2008)
 Happy Christmas (2010)

Tours

Headlining
 DreamChaser Tour (2001)
 Reality Tour (2004)

Co-headlining
Total Request Live Tour  (2001)

Opening act
 Livin' la Vida Loca Tour (Ricky Martin) (1999)
 Heat It Up Tour (98 Degrees) (2000)
 Bob That Head Tour (Rascal Flatts) (2009)

See also
List of awards and nominations received by Jessica Simpson

References

Works cited

Further reading

External links

 
 

 
1980 births
Living people
Actresses from Texas
American child singers
American contemporary R&B singers
American dance musicians
American dancers
American fashion designers
American female dancers
American film actresses
American sopranos
American television actresses
American women country singers
American women fashion designers
American women pop singers
Baptists from Texas
Columbia Records artists
Epic Records artists
Participants in American reality television series
People from Abilene, Texas
Singers from Texas
Southern Baptists
United Service Organizations entertainers
21st-century American actresses
21st-century American singers
21st-century American women singers
Texas Republicans